The Charleston Swamp Foxes were one of the 15 original teams to join the inaugural 2000 AF2 season.  They started off in the American Conference, before switching divisions in every year of their existence (2001-Northeast, 2002-Southern & 2003-Atlantic).  Charleston played their home games in the North Charleston Coliseum.  Every year, the Swamp Foxes improved their Win–loss record going 4-12 in 2000, then 7-9 in 2001 and 2002, & 9-7 in 2003.  After the 2003 season, the Swamp Foxes folded, and Arena Football in Charleston, South Carolina was absent until the 2006 formation of the Charleston/Carolina Sandsharks.  The Charleston franchise was named after Francis Marion, also known as "The Swamp Fox".

Season-by-Season

Notable players
 Rob Bironas - Tennessee Titans kicker
Joe Judge

External links
 Charleston Swamp Foxes on ArenaFan.com

Sports in Charleston, South Carolina
American football teams in South Carolina
Defunct af2 teams
Defunct sports teams in South Carolina
American football teams established in 2000
American football teams disestablished in 2003